Atractus iridescens, the iridescent ground snake, is a species of snake in the family Colubridae. The species can be found in Colombia and Ecuador.

References 

Atractus
Reptiles of Colombia
Reptiles of Ecuador
Snakes of South America
Reptiles described in 1896
Taxa named by Mario Giacinto Peracca